Strictly Business is the soundtrack to the 1991 comedy film, Strictly Business. It was released on October 29, 1991 through Uptown Records and consisted of hip hop and R&B music. The soundtrack reached number 64 on the Top R&B Albums chart, and its lone single, "Strictly Business" by LL Cool J, did not chart.

Track listing

1991 soundtrack albums
Contemporary R&B soundtracks
Hip hop soundtracks
MCA Records soundtracks
Uptown Records albums
Comedy film soundtracks